Nikola Boranijašević  (born 19 May 1992) is a Serbian professional footballer who plays as a right-back for FC Zürich.

Career
Boranijašević signed with Lausanne-Sport on 7 January 2019.

References

External links
 Profile at Srbijafudbal.
 

Living people
1992 births
Serbian footballers
Association football fullbacks
Serbian First League players
Serbian SuperLiga players
Latvian Higher League players
Swiss Challenge League players
Swiss Super League players
FK Borac Čačak players
FK Polet Ljubić players
FK Rudar Kostolac players
FK Ventspils players
FK Napredak Kruševac players
FC Lausanne-Sport players
FC Zürich players
Serbian expatriate footballers
Serbian expatriate sportspeople in Latvia
Expatriate footballers in Latvia
Serbian expatriate sportspeople in Switzerland
Expatriate footballers in Switzerland
People from Nova Varoš